Nadine-Josette Chaline (born 1938) is a contemporary French historian, specialist in religious history, especially Christians in France.

Biography 
Nadine-Josette Chaline is the wife of Jean-Pierre Chaline, himself a historian (a specialist of the nineteenth century), and the mother of Olivier Chaline, a historian specializing in Central Europe in the modern era. She taught at the University of Picardie Jules Verne. She is a member of the Académie des sciences, belles-lettres et arts de Rouen

In 1986, Nadine-Josette Chaline was awarded the Prix Yvan Loiseau by the Académie française for her work Des catholiques normands, sous la troisième République, crises-combats-renouveaux.

Main works 
1976: Le Diocèse de Rouen-Le Havre,  
1993: Chrétiens dans la Première Guerre mondiale, Éditions du Cerf, 
1995: L'Enseignement catholique en France aux XIXe et XXe siècles, Cerf
2001: Carmes et Carmélites en France du XVIIe siècle à nos jours, in collaboration, Cerf
2003: Jean Lecanuet. Témoignages de François Bayrou et Dominique Baudis, in collaboration, Beauchesne,  ;
2008: Gardiens de la mémoire. Les monuments aux morts de la Grande Guerre dans l'Allier (with Daniel Moulinet's collaboration), Yzeure,  ;
2014: Émile Guillaumin. Paysan-écrivain bourbonnais, soldat de la Grande Guerre, Josette Chaline éd., Paris, ill. (prix Allen 2015)  (annotated publication of the wartime correspondence of Emile Guillaumin)

External links 
  Nadine-Josette Chaline (dir.), Chrétiens dans la première guerre mondiale; Annette Becker, La guerre et la foi. De la mort à la mémoire (1914-1930) (compte rendu) on Persée
 Nadine-Josette Chaline on the site of the Académie française
 La Grâce d'une cathédrale
 Publications on CAIRN

1938 births
Living people
20th-century French historians
French women historians
21st-century French historians
French historians of religion
20th-century French women
21st-century French women